TMT Law Practice (TMT) is India’s first Technology, Media and Telecommunications Law firm with offices in New Delhi, Chennai, Bengaluru, Kolkata, Ahmedabad, Mysuru, and Bhubaneshwar, with an associate network office in Mumbai.

Practice area
The practice of the firm includes Intellectual Property, Regulatory, Corporate and Transactional, Dispute Resolution, and Legislative work in the Technology, Media and Telecommunications Industry.

The practice areas of the firm are Intellectual Property Rights, IP Enforcement & Anti-Piracy, Media & Broadcasting Litigation, Technology Licensing Advisory, Entertainment & Sports Litigation, Regulatory Advocacy & Interface, Licensing Advisory & Negotiations, Private Equity & Venture Capital, Brand Protection Strategies, Privacy & Data Protection, Mergers & Acquisitions, Contracts & Negotiations, Dispute Resolution, Competition Advisory & Litigation, General Commercial Services and Shipping / Maritime Disputes.

As a law firm catering to the TMT sector, the firm is focused on serving the following sectors: Technology; Media and Entertainment; and Telecommunications.

The firm caters almost exclusively to the following Industries:

Technology
 Biotechnology
 Information Technology
 Software Products and Services
 Hardware Manufacturers
 Robotics
 Pharmaceutical

Media and Entertainment
 Motion Picture and Film companies – Production, Distribution, Talent, etc.
 Television including Cable, DTH, IPTV and HITS operators.
 Radio including FM, Satellite and Internet Radio Operators
 Copyright Societies
 Content Aggregators
 Sport
 Celebrity / Personality Management Agencies
 Event Management Companies
 Equipment manufacturers
 Creative Industries e.g. Publishing, Multimedia and Interactive, Advertising and Marketing, Fashion
 and all such businesses that are driven by or reliant on intellectual property rights, companies facing counterfeiting and IP infringement issues, Franchise operations, companies using IP as a primary way of raising investor value

Telecommunications
 GSM Operators
 CDMA operators
 VoIP and Internet application providers
 VAS Providers and Aggregators
 Knowledge Process Outsourcing
 System Integrators
 Equipment manufacturers

 Shipping / Maritime Laws 
 Charter Party Disputes
 Maritime Liens
 Claims
 Pollution Damages
 Short Landings
 P & I
 Ship Arrests
 Wrongful Act, Neglect or Default in the Management of the Ship
 Crew Claims
 Personal Injury or Loss of Life

Air and Space
 The firm has recently opened an Air and Space Law Forum teaming up with NUJS.

Clientele
The firm's past and present clientele include names such as Google, Tata Sky, Sony Entertainment Television, Piramal Healthcare, Orange, Viacom 18, Indian Broadcasting Foundation and the Association of Radio Operators of India.

The firm was recently in news when TMT Law Practice and three senior advocates won a Supreme Court stay of the 10-day suspension of Viacom-owned TV channel Comedy Central that was ordered by the Delhi High Court.

References

External links
Delhi Lawyers Website

Law firms of India